Les Quennevais School (Jèrriais: L'êcole des Tchennevais) is a secondary school, owned and operated by the States of Jersey, and located in the parish of Saint Brélade in Jersey.

History
In 2015, it was decided that the Les Quennevais secondary school buildings needed to be replaced because they were outdated, too small for the student body, and on a site that is too small for a modern school. The new build took place on fields 80, 84 and 85 off Rue Carrée and was opened in September 
2021.

Headteachers
The three houses that consist within Les Quennevais are named after the first three headteachers: Watts, Tranter and McKeon.

John Watts: 1964-1969
Ted Tranter: 1970-1988
Tom McKeon: 1988-1992
Jenny Hydes: 1992-1999
John Thorp: 1999-2013
Sarah Hague: 2013 to present

See also
 Les Quennevais Rugby Club
 List of schools in Jersey

References

External links

Schools in Jersey
Secondary schools in the Channel Islands